Rebecca Reynolds is an American poet.

Life
Reynolds was born in Washington D.C., United States, in which city she also grew up. She graduated from Vassar College, Rutgers University (MA in English), and the University of Michigan (MFA in creative writing/poetry). Since 1991, she has worked as an administrator at Douglass College, and has also taught Creative Writing at Rutgers University.

Stephen Burt calls her an elliptical poet.
Her work has appeared in Quarterly West, Boston Review, Spoon River Poetry Review, Cimarron Review, Quarterly West, Verse, and other journals.

She lives in Highland Park, New Jersey.

Awards
 Hopwood Award
 New Jersey State Council on the Arts grant
 1998 Norma Farber First Book Award from the Poetry Society for Daughter of the Hangnail

Works

Poetry books

Anthologies

References

Year of birth missing (living people)
Living people
Vassar College alumni
Rutgers University alumni
University of Michigan alumni
Rutgers University faculty
Poets from Washington, D.C.
Baylor University faculty
American women poets
American women academics
21st-century American women